Sir Nicholas Cosmo Bonsor, 4th Baronet, DL (born 9 December 1942) is a British Conservative politician.

Early life
Bonsor was educated at Eton College and Keble College, Oxford.

Political career
Having unsuccessfully fought Newcastle-under-Lyme in both February and October 1974 elections, Bonsor was Member of Parliament for Nantwich from 1979 to 1983, then for Upminster from 1983 until he lost the seat to Labour's Keith Darvill in 1997. He was Minister of State for Foreign Affairs from 1995 to 1997 and practised as a barrister in London.

In 1994, just before he became a minister, Bonsor had challenged the incumbent Sir Marcus Fox for the chairmanship of the influential 1922 Committee, and narrowly lost by 129 votes to 116. Bonsor, a Eurosceptic, had previously rebelled against the government by voting several times against the ratification of the Maastricht Treaty in the 1992-93 parliamentary session.

Post-Parliamentary career
He lives at Liscombe Park near Soulbury in Buckinghamshire and is a Deputy Lieutenant of Buckinghamshire.

He pledged support, by appearing together in a public meeting, to Nigel Farage MEP in his 2010 general election campaign for the Buckingham constituency, standing against the speaker of the House (standing for re-election), John Bercow.

He is a vice-president of the Standing Council of the Baronetage.

Family
Sir Nicholas was the elder son of Sir Bryan Bonsor (1916–1977) and his wife Elizabeth Hambro (1920–1995). In 1969, he married Hon. Nadine Marisa Lampson, now the Hon. Lady Bonsor, a daughter of Graham Curtis Lampson, 2nd Baron Killearn. They have had five children, including elder son and heir Alexander Cosmo Walrond Bonsor (b. 1976) and entrepreneur Mary Bonsor (b. 1987).

Notes

References
Times Guide to the House of Commons, Times Newspapers Limited, 1997
Kidd, Charles, Williamson, David (editors). Debrett's Peerage and Baronetage (1990 edition). New York: St Martin's Press, 1990,

External links 
 

1942 births
Living people
People educated at Eton College
Alumni of Keble College, Oxford
Conservative Party (UK) MPs for English constituencies
UK MPs 1979–1983
UK MPs 1983–1987
UK MPs 1987–1992
UK MPs 1992–1997
Deputy Lieutenants of Buckinghamshire
People from Leighton Buzzard
Baronets in the Baronetage of the United Kingdom 
British Eurosceptics